Douglass High School may refer to:

Douglass High School (Atlanta, Georgia)
Douglass High School (Kansas), located in Douglass, Kansas
Douglass High School (Kingsport, Tennessee), African-American high school closed in 1966
Douglass High School (Memphis, Tennessee)
Douglass High School (Webster Groves, Missouri), segregated school that operated from 1926 to 1956
Douglass High School (Leesburg, Virginia)

Frederick Douglass High School may refer to:
Frederick Douglass Academy, New York, New York
Frederick Douglass High School (Baltimore, Maryland)
Frederick Douglass High School (Columbia, Missouri)
Frederick Douglass High School (Lexington, Kentucky) 
Frederick Douglass High School (Prince George's County, Maryland)
Frederick A. Douglass High School (New Orleans), located in New Orleans, Louisiana
Frederick A. Douglass High School (Oklahoma), located in Oklahoma City, Oklahoma

See also
Douglas High School (disambiguation)
Douglass School (disambiguation)